Mussolini: The Untold Story is a television biographical miniseries drama that aired on November 24–26, 1985. The series followed the rise, rule, and downfall of the Italian dictator Benito Mussolini (played by US actor George C. Scott).

Mussolini's private life features prominently in the series, including his long-term romance with his mistress Clara Petacci (played by Virginia Madsen).

The series begins in 1922, as Mussolini gathers his power through the use of his Black Shirt militia. Promoting himself as Julius Caesar reincarnate, Il Duce gains a national fervor that peaks after the Italian invasion of Abyssinia (Ethiopia) in 1935. In 1938, Mussolini attempted to promote peace at the Munich Conference. Nonetheless, he aligned himself with Adolf Hitler. Mussolini drew Italy into World War II, which led to his country's decline, Mussolini's fall from power, and eventual roadside execution of Mussolini and Petacci.

The Series was Nominated for two Primetime Emmy Awards.

Premise
The rise and fall of the Italian fascist dictator, Benito Mussolini.

Cast
 George C. Scott as Benito Mussolini
 David Suchet as Dino Grandi
 Lee Grant as Rachele Mussolini
 Mary Elizabeth Mastrantonio as Edda Mussolini-Ciano
 Raul Julia as Count Galeazzo Ciano
 Tracy-Louise Ward as Countess Maria Ciano
 Virginia Madsen as Claretta Petacci
 Robert Downey Jr. as Bruno Mussolini
 Paul Kehagias as Young Bruno Mussolini
 Gabriel Byrne as Vittorio Mussolini
 Spencer Chandler as Young Vittorio Mussolini
 Kenneth Colley as King Vittorio Emmanuele
 Gunnar Moller as Adolf Hitler
 Gina Bellman as Gena Ruberti
 Godfrey James as Marshal Pietro Badoglio
 Michael Aldridge as Matteotti
 George Coulouris as DeBono
 Vernon Dobtcheff as Sebastiani
 Constantine Gregory as Baron Russo
 Paul Herzberg as Major Spogler
 Wolf Kahler as Skorzeny
 Richard Kane as Von Ribbentrop
 Anne-Louise Lambert as Orsala
 Annabel Leventon as Senora Petacci
 Michael MacKenzie as Amalfi
 Philip Madoc as Buchini
 Stephen Marshall as Romano
 Tony Vogel as Tarabella
 Milton Johns as German Ambassador

External links
 

1985 films
Films about Benito Mussolini
Films with screenplays by Stirling Silliphant
Films directed by William Graham (director)
Films scored by Laurence Rosenthal
1980s British television miniseries
1980s American television miniseries